Calanidae is the largest taxonomic family of calanoid copepods. It includes the genus Calanus, which may be the most abundant metazoan genus on Earth.

Copepods of the genera Calanus and Neocalanus are ecologically important in the Arctic and subarctic regions of the world's oceans.

Genera

The family contains the following genera:

Calanoides 
Calanus 
Canthocalanus 
Cosmocalanus 
Mesocalanus 
Metranura 
Nannocalanus 
Neocalanus 
Undinula

References

External links 
 
 Guide to the marine zooplankton of south eastern Australia

Calanoida
Taxa named by James Dwight Dana
Crustacean families